Mong Yawng  Township is a township of Tachileik District (formerly part of Mong Hpayak District) in the Shan State of Myanmar.  The main town is Mong Yawng.

History
Mongyawng State (Möngyawng) was one of the Shan States, largely inhabited by Wa people. It was annexed by Kengtung State in 1815. The capital was the town of Mong Yawng.

References

Townships of Shan State